Expedition of Abi Hadrad al-Aslami, took place in January 629 AD, 7AH, Shawwal (tenth month) of the Islamic Calendar. In this expedition, the chief of the Banu Jusham tribe Rifa’a ibn Qays was successfully assassinated.

Assassination of Rifa’a ibn Qays
Rifa’ah bin Qays and some men from the Banu Jusham bin Mo’awiya camped in al-Ghābah. According to Ibn Hisham he reportedly wanted to gather the people of Qais and entice them into fighting the Muslims. Muhammad, on hearing these reports, despatched Abu Hadrad with two men.

They set out until they were near the camp of Rifa’ah and his men and gathered intelligence. In the night, Abu Hadrad killed Rifa’ah, and then he with his two companions went back to Muhammad. The Muslim scholar Saifur Rahman al Mubarakpuri also mentions that, Abu Hadrad, through a clever strategy, managed to rout the enemy and capture many of their cattle as booty.

According to Ibn Hisham. Abu Hardad shot Qais with an arrow in the heart, and then cut off his head and quickly escaped, Ibn Hisham writes:

"As he went he passed by me, and when he came in range I shot him in the heart with an arrow, and he died without uttering a word. I leapt upon him and cut off his head and ran in the direction of the camp shouting ”Allah hu akbar”."[Ibn Hisham, Pg 671]
In total 1 person was beheaded and 4 women were captured by Muslims.

Islamic Primary sources
The Expedition is referenced by the Muslim scholar Ibn Sa'd in his book, Kitab al-tabaqat al-kabir, Volume 2 and by Ibn Hisham, in his biography of Muhammad. Ibn Hisham mentions the event as follows:

See also
Military career of Muhammad
List of expeditions of Muhammad

Notes

629
Campaigns ordered by Muhammad